Deborah Ann Wilford (born 1961) is a New Zealand born, Norfolk Islands international lawn bowler.

Bowls career
Wilford has represented the Norfolk Islands at the Commonwealth Games, in the pairs at the 2006 Commonwealth Games.

She won two medals at the Asia Pacific Bowls Championships.

References

Norfolk Island sportspeople
1961 births
Living people
Bowls players at the 2006 Commonwealth Games
Norfolk Island bowls players